The list of parties to the Nuclear Non-Proliferation Treaty encompasses the states which have signed and ratified or acceded to the international agreement limiting the spread of nuclear weapons.

On 1 July 1968, the Nuclear Non-Proliferation Treaty (NPT) was opened for signature. The three depositary states were the Soviet Union (and later its successor state Russia), the United Kingdom, the United States; states wishing to become a party to the NPT must deposit their instruments of ratification, accession or succession with at least one of the depositary governments.  The treaty came into force and closed for signature on 5 March 1970 with the deposit of ratification of the three depositary states and 40 others. Since then, states that did not sign the treaty may only accede to it.

The treaty recognizes five states as nuclear-weapon states: the United States, Russia, the United Kingdom, France, and China (also the five permanent members of the United Nations Security Council).  China and France acceded to the treaty in 1992.  Four other states are known or believed to possess nuclear weapons: India, Pakistan and North Korea have openly tested and declared that they possess nuclear weapons, while Israel has had a policy of opacity regarding its nuclear weapons program. India, Israel, and Pakistan have never signed the treaty, while North Korea was a party to the treaty but announced its withdrawal on 10 January 2003, which became effective ninety days later. However, there is disagreement among the parties to the treaty whether North Korea's withdrawal was in conformity with the terms of the treaty.

The NPT remains the most widely subscribed to nuclear arms control treaty in history. As of February 2015, 190 states are recognized as parties to the treaty, excluding North Korea which withdrew. The State of Palestine is the most recent state to have joined, having submitted its instrument of succession on 10 February 2015. Four UN member states have never signed the treaty: India, Israel, Pakistan, and South Sudan. The Cook Islands and Niue, two associated states of New Zealand which have had their "full treaty-making capacity" recognised by United Nations Secretariat, are not parties to the treaty but consider themselves bound by its provisions by virtue of their administration by New Zealand when the latter ratified the NPT.

Ratified or acceded states
189 UN member states as well as two observers, namely the Holy See and the State of Palestine, have become parties to the NPT.  However, one of these states (North Korea) submitted a notice of withdrawal.  See the section #Withdrawn state below for more details.

Multiple dates indicate the different days in which states submitted their signature or deposition, varied by location. This location is noted by: (L) for London, (M) for Moscow, and (W) for Washington D.C.

Bolded states with a dagger are recognized as nuclear weapons states by the treaty.

Partially recognized state abiding by treaty
When the PRC subsequently ratified the treaty, they described the Republic of China's (ROC) ratification as "illegal". The ROC has committed itself to continue to adhere to the requirements of the treaty, and the United States has declared that it still regards the authorities in Taiwan to be bound by the NPT's obligations.

Withdrawn state
Article X.1 allows a state to leave the treaty if "extraordinary events, related to the subject matter of this Treaty, have jeopardized the supreme interests of its country", giving three months notice. The state is required to give reasons for leaving the NPT in this notice, and to provide this notice to other NPT Parties and to the UN Security Council. This Article does not provide for other states to question a state's interpretation of "supreme interests of its country".

North Korea acceded to the NPT in 1985.  On 12 March 1993, after it was found in non-compliance with its safeguards agreement, North Korea gave notice to withdraw from the NPT. However, on 11 June 1993, one day before the withdrawal was to take effect, North Korea reached agreement with the United States to freeze its nuclear program under the Agreed Framework and "suspended" its withdrawal notice. In October 2002, the United States accused North Korea of violating the Agreed Framework by pursuing a secret uranium enrichment program, and suspended shipments of heavy fuel oil under that agreement. In response, North Korea expelled IAEA inspectors, disabled IAEA equipment and, on 10 January 2003, announced that it was ending the suspension of its previous NPT withdrawal notification.  There is disagreement among the parties to the treaty whether North Korea's withdrawal was in conformity with the terms of the treaty.  North Korea said that only one more day's notice was sufficient for withdrawal from the NPT, as it had given 89 days before.  The IAEA Board of Governors rejected this interpretation.  Most countries held that a new three-months withdrawal notice was required, and some questioned whether North Korea's notification met the "extraordinary events" and "supreme interests" requirements of the Treaty. The Joint Statement of 19 September 2005 at the end of the Fourth Round of the Six-Party Talks called for North Korea to "return" to the NPT, implicitly acknowledging that it had withdrawn. As of October, 2016, North Korea has conducted five announced nuclear tests between October 9 2006 to September 9 2016.

In 2020, Iran threatened to withdraw from the NPT if it is referred to the United Nations Security Council for alleged breaching the Joint Comprehensive Plan of Action.

Other states
Four UN member states have never been a party to the treaty.

The Cook Islands and Niue, two associated states of New Zealand which have had their "full treaty-making capacity" recognised by United Nations Secretariat, are not parties to the treaty but consider themselves bound by its provisions by virtue of their administration by New Zealand when the latter ratified the NPT.

See also 

 List of parties to the Biological Weapons Convention
 List of parties to the Chemical Weapons Convention
 List of parties to the Convention on Certain Conventional Weapons
 List of parties to the Comprehensive Nuclear-Test-Ban Treaty
 List of parties to the Ottawa Treaty
 List of parties to the Partial Nuclear Test Ban Treaty
List of parties to the Treaty on the Prohibition of Nuclear Weapons
List of parties to weapons of mass destruction treaties

References

Nuclear Non-Proliferation Treaty
Treaties
Nuclear warfare
Nuclear weapons policy
Nuclear Non-Proliferation